The New York City Department of Parks and Recreation maintains a unit of full-time and seasonal uniformed officers who enforce parks department rules and regulations, as well as New York State laws within the jurisdiction of New York City parks. Established in 1981, NYC Parks Enforcement Patrol officers patrol on foot, bicycle, horseback, and in marked vehicles. Parks Enforcement officers are responsible for protecting NYC Park land, waterways under the jurisdiction of the Department of Parks and Recreation, city owned monuments, and public pools. PEP officers additionally act as the Parks’ ambassadors.

The New York City Police Department patrol all New York City parks and is the primary Policing and investigation agency within the New York City as per the NYC Charter (law).

History 

The history of the Park Enforcement Patrol Officers can be traced back to 1919, when the concept of the Parks Enforcement Patrol was first thought of by Bronx Parks Commissioner Joe Hennessy, who reported in the "1919 Annual Report of the Department of Parks" the "necessity of a proper protective force" to be established. The following year in his 1920 annual report to the mayor, Commissioner Hennessy once again pushed for a full-time park police force. On page 16 of the 1920 annual report he wrote that "Vandalism is ever present. It can never be checked until the Parks Department has a force of keepers with police authority" and he recommended that the "Park protectors should be under control of Park Commissioners absolutely". In 1920, legislature was passed for the creation of a force of park keepers for NYC parks but the city refused to approve it and authorize funding.

In an effort to show the mayor the effectiveness of a park patrol force in hopes of having a full-time force established, Commissioner Hennessy created volunteer park inspectors (later called "Auxiliary Park Inspectors") to patrol the Bronx parks during the day. According to his "1919 annual report of the Department of Parks", the first park inspector he appointed was Inspector William Blackie. Inspector Blackie was injured on Columbus Day 1919 while attempting to arrest two men poaching song birds in Van Cortlandt Park.

Despite the objection of the New York City Police Department, Commissioner Hennessy established the first Park Patrol Harbor unit when he obtained two small motor boats from the Navy which he immediately put into service and had park staff patrol the waterways of the Hutchinson River.

In 1922, Commissioner Henessy (through his annual report) requested the mayor to establish special magistrates to deal with park related violations the same day the violator was arrested, provide police authority to the parks commissioners (each borough had a commissioner), and provide funding for a park patrol unit because the New York City Police officers "detailed to the Bronx parks in the summer on Saturdays, Sundays and holidays are not anxious to serve summonses or enforce the ordinances"

Staffing 
As of 2016, the agency employed on estimate 300+ officers. After the end of the year 2016, there are going to be, on estimate, about 180 more officers on the field . Numbers have fallen due to budget constraints and personnel leavings. As of 2014, there were 280 officers with the expectancy of 400 officers by the year 2015. 

To address the need for additional PEP officers and to ensure that more City parks receive the benefit of having PEP officers present, the Council allocated $5 million in the Fiscal 2015 budget for 80 additional
PEP officers. However, because the funding was not base-lined, it is not included in the Fiscal
2016 Preliminary Budget. 

The Council urges the Administration to increase the baseline funding
for PEP officers in Fiscal 2016 by $5 million for 80 additional PEP officers, bringing the total
number of PEP officers to 360, including 98 that are privately funded in Fiscal 2016.

Ranks 
Following a paramilitary model, There are seven titles (referred to as ranks) in the New York City Department of Parks & Recreation, Parks Enforcement Patrol:

Power, authority and equipment 

New York City park enforcement officers are special patrolmen in connection with special duties of employment. They have limited Peace Officers authority pursuant to New York State Criminal Procedure Law § 2.10(27) as listed in Chapter 13 subsection (C): Special Patrolmen.

Training and Equipment 
Parks enforcement officer attend an 12-week peace officer training academy at Randall's Island. 

Training encompasses:

physical fitness, 
law enforcement procedures,
arrests,
ethics, 
customer service, 
criminal procedure and penal law, 
parks rules and regulations, 
summons writing, 
verbal Judo, 
traffic control, 
NYC Parks & Urban Park Ranger history, 
animal rescue (domestic/wildlife), 
Ranger duties, 
ice rescue training, 
CPR and first aid, 
unarmed self-defense training and baton (PR-24) certification.

PEP officers are prohibited by New State Criminal Procedure Law to carry or use a fireram, but do carry the following equipment:
Baton (PR-24)
Pepper spray
Handcuffs
Radio that is linked with dispatch and other officers.

Urban Park Rangers 

Begun in 1979 NYC Urban Park Rangers are a separate division within the department, and although they do have peace officer powers through Special Patrolman status, their primary function is to link New Yorkers to the natural world through public education. Unlike the Parks Enforcement officers, who have a primary mission of law enforcement in the parks.

Rangers operate out of the city's seven nature centers and lead nature-oriented programs.  Like PEP, they patrol in marked vehicles.  Rangers are also responsible for handling injured, abandoned, or displaced wild animals found in the city's parks.

Mounted auxiliary unit 

Begun in 1996 the NYC Parks Enforcement Patrol Mounted Auxiliary Unit is a volunteer unit within the department. This unit is made up of private citizens who volunteer their time by working with officers of the Parks Enforcement Patrol. 

Auxiliary officers patrol in uniform and on horseback in various NYC parks, and "ensure the preservation of the natural and living resources in the city's parks, as well as the safety of those utilizing the parks, by maintaining a clearly visible presence. They monitor areas that are not accessible by vehicle; they deter, identify and report illegal or unsafe activities that require Parks Enforcement Patrol or police attention; and they advise the public on park rules and regulations."

As an IRS 501C Corporation, the Auxiliary solicits funding to purchase horses, tack and provide training for both the Volunteers and the Professional Officers. Since inception it has provided several hundred thousand dollars towards the operation of the Mounted Unit, including the Capital Construction of a new barn. Former Parks Commissioner Adrian Benepe was quoted as saying "there is some doubt that the Parks Department could afford to run a mounted unit without the Mounted Auxiliary."

Auxiliary officers do not have powers beyond a citizen and cannot make arrests. For this reason a typical patrol will include a PPEP Officer and an Auxiliary Officer. By combining the two, the manpower of the Parks Enforcement Patrol is significantly increased at no cost to the city.  Should the team come upon a situation requiring enforcement, the PEP Officer can deal with it while the Auxiliary Officer covers the Officer's back and radios the situation to Parks Central and if needed will ask for additional help. 
"

Union representation 
Urban Park Rangers and Associate Urban Park Rangers (Sergeants) are represented by DC37 Local 983, a civil service employees union. The union is currently headed by President Joseph Puleo.

Park Security Service
The PEP also have a security trained service that provide participants with experience needed for future employment in the private sector.

See also 
List of law enforcement agencies in New York
Law enforcement in New York City
New York city
New York State Park Police
United States Park Police

References

External links
NYC Comptrollers Audit of the Parks Enforcement Patrol
DC37 Local 983, NYC Motor Vehicle Operators

New York City Department of Parks and Recreation
Specialist police departments of New York (state)
Parks Enforcement Patrol
Park police departments of the United States
1981 establishments in New York City
Government agencies established in 1981